The Lord of Kilbride was a title in the peerage of Scotland.

List of lords of Kilbride
 William de Valognes (????-1233)
 David Comyn (1233-1247)
 William Comyn (1247-1283)
 Edmund Comyn (1283-1306)
 forfeited to the Crown

References
 Young, Alan; "Robert the Bruce's Rivals: The Comyns, 1212-1314", Tuckwell Press, 1997, 9781862320536

Clan Comyn
Feudalism in Scotland